Novaya Derevnya is a rural locality (a village) in Krasavino Urban Settlement, Velikoustyugsky District, Vologda Oblast, Russia. The population was 28 as of 2002.

Geography 
Novaya Derevnya is located 28 km northeast of Veliky Ustyug (the district's administrative centre) by road. Bukhinino is the nearest rural locality.

References 

Rural localities in Velikoustyugsky District